Tatyana Akhmetova-Amanzhol (also Tatyana Bakatyuk, ; born 17 October 1985 in Alma-Ata) is an amateur Kazakh freestyle wrestler, who played for the women's flyweight category. In 2009, Bakatyuk won a gold medal for the 51 kg class at the Asian Wrestling Championships in Pattaya, Thailand, and at the FILA Golden Grand Prix in Baku, Azerbaijan.

Bakatyuk represented Kazakhstan at the 2008 Summer Olympics in Beijing, where she competed for the women's 48 kg class. She defeated Germany's Alexandra Engelhardt and El Salvador's Íngrid Medrano in the preliminary rounds, before losing out the semi-final match to Canada's Carol Huynh, who was able to score five points in two straight periods, leaving Bakatyuk without a single point. Because her opponent advanced further into the final, Bakatyuk automatically qualified for the bronze medal bout, where she was defeated by Azerbaijan's Mariya Stadnik, with a technical score of 1–10.

At 2020 Asian Championships in New Delhi, she pulled off a stunning victory in the 53kg final over two-time world champion Mayu Mukaida of Japan. Mukaida was leading 8-0 when she attempted to turn Akhmetova-Amanzhol over for the points that would give her a technical fall victory. But Akhmetova-Amanzhol stopped the move midway to catch Mukaida on her back, then secured a victory by fall. 
It was her first Asian title since winning back-to-back golds in 2013 and 2014.

She competed in the women's 53 kg event at the 2020 Summer Olympics in Tokyo, Japan.

References

External links
 
 
 
 

Kazakhstani female sport wrestlers
1985 births
Living people
Olympic wrestlers of Kazakhstan
Wrestlers at the 2008 Summer Olympics
Wrestlers at the 2020 Summer Olympics
Sportspeople from Almaty
Wrestlers at the 2014 Asian Games
Asian Games medalists in wrestling
Asian Games bronze medalists for Kazakhstan
Medalists at the 2014 Asian Games
Asian Wrestling Championships medalists